Wang Ter-chang (born 9 August 1962) is a Taiwanese golfer who plays mainly on the Asian Tour. He turned professional in 1985 and has won four Asian Tour titles.

Professional wins (6)

Asian Tour wins (4)

Asian Tour playoff record (1–0)

Asia Golf Circuit wins (2)
1991 Mercuries Masters
1992 Philippine Open

Team appearances
Professional
Dunhill Cup (representing Taiwan): 1991
World Cup (representing Taiwan): 1992, 2004, 2005

External links

 
Taiwanese male golfers
Asian Tour golfers
1962 births
Living people